Donald Craig Stewart (1928–2009) was a Canadian politician. He represented the electoral district of Marquette in the House of Commons from 1968 to 1979.

He was a member of the Progressive Conservative Party.

Electoral record

External links
 

1928 births
2009 deaths
Members of the House of Commons of Canada from Manitoba
Progressive Conservative Party of Canada MPs
People from Portage la Prairie